Knox County is a county in the U.S. state of Indiana in the United States. The oldest county in Indiana, it was one of two original counties created in the Northwest Territory in 1790, alongside, St. Clair County, Illinois. Knox County was gradually reduced in size as subsequent counties were established. It was established in its present configuration when Daviess County was partitioned off (2 February 1818). At the 2010 United States Census, the county population was 38,440. The county seat is Vincennes.

Knox County comprises the Vincennes, IN Micropolitan Statistical Area.

History
In 1790, Winthrop Sargent, Secretary of Northwest Territory, organized Knox County, the fourth in the Northwest Territory. It was named for Major General Henry Knox, who had completed his term as second U.S. Secretary of War the previous September. Knox County was created prior to the formation of the Indiana Territory. When it was created, Knox County extended to Canada and encompassed all or part of the present states of Indiana, Michigan, Illinois, and Ohio. When the Illinois Territory was formed in 1809, the portions of Knox County beyond the Wabash River became Saint Clair County, Illinois.

Many of Knox County townships and lots were surveyed with the French system, which employs non-cardinal compass points. Knox and Clark counties are the only ones laid out in this fashion.

Geography
Knox County lies on the west edge of the state; its western border abuts the eastern border of Illinois across the Wabash River. The county's west border is defined by the south-flowing Wabash River, and its east border is defined by the south-southwest-flowing White River. Its southwesternmost point occurs at the confluence of the two rivers, near Mount Carmel, Illinois. The terrain consists of verdant low-rolling hills, largely devoted to agriculture. Its highest points (around  ASL) occur in the hills midway between Bruceville and Bicknell.

Major highways

Adjacent counties

 Sullivan County - north
 Greene County - northeast
 Daviess County - east
 Pike County - southeast
 Gibson County - south
 Wabash County, Illinois - southwest
 Lawrence County, Illinois - west
 Crawford County, Illinois - northwest

National protected area
 George Rogers Clark National Historical Park

Communities

Cities
 Bicknell
 Vincennes

Towns

 Bruceville
 Decker
 Edwardsport
 Monroe City
 Oaktown
 Sandborn
 Wheatland

Census-designated places

 Emison
 Freelandville
 Ragsdale
 Westphalia

Unincorporated areas

 Beal
 Busseron
 Fritchton
 Indian Creek Settlement
 Iona
 Little Rock
 Orrville
 Pond Creek Mills
 Purcell
 Saint Thomas
 Verne
 Wagner Station
 Willis

Townships

 Busseron
 Decker
 Harrison
 Johnson
 Palmyra
 Steen
 Vigo
 Vincennes
 Washington
 Widner

Climate and weather

Government

The county government is a constitutional body, and is granted specific powers by the Constitution of Indiana, and by the Indiana Code.

County Council: The legislative branch of the county government; controls the county's spending and revenue collection. Representatives are elected from county districts to four-year terms. They set salaries, the annual budget, and special spending. The council has limited authority to impose local taxes, in the form of an income and property tax that is subject to state level approval, excise taxes, and service taxes.

Board of Commissioners: The executive body of the county. The commissioners are elected county-wide to staggered four-year terms. One commissioner serves as president. The commissioners are charged with executing the legislative acts of the County Council, collecting revenue, and managing the county government's functions.

Court: The county maintains a small claims court that can handle some civil cases. The court judge is elected to a four-year term, and must be a member of the Indiana Bar Association. The judge is assisted by a constable, who is elected county-wide to a four-year term. Some court decisions can be appealed to the state level circuit court.

County Officials: The county has several other elected offices, including sheriff, coroner, auditor, treasurer, recorder, surveyor, and circuit court clerk. Each is elected county-wide to a four-year term. Members elected to county government positions are required to declare party affiliations and to be residents of the county.

Knox County is part of Indiana's 8th congressional district, Indiana Senate districts 39 and 48, and Indiana House of Representatives districts 45 and 64.

Demographics

As of the 2010 United States Census, there were 38,440 people, 15,249 households, and 9,725 families in the county. The racial makeup of the county was 94.9% white, 2.6% black or African American, 0.6% Asian, 0.2% American Indian, 0.5% from other races, and 1.2% from two or more races. Those of Hispanic or Latino origin made up 1.5% of the population. In terms of ancestry, 26.9% were German, 19.9% were American, 13.0% were Irish, and 9.1% were English.

Of the 15,249 households, 29.1% had children under the age of 18 living with them, 48.5% were married couples living together, 11.1% had a female householder with no husband present, 36.2% were non-families, and 30.1% of all households were made up of individuals. The average household size was 2.35 and the average family size was 2.90. The median age was 38.5 years.

The median income for a household in the county was $47,697 and the median income for a family was $51,534. Males had a median income of $40,553 versus $27,201 for females. The per capita income for the county was $20,381. About 12.6% of families and 16.4% of the population were below the poverty line, including 22.7% of those under age 18 and 11.4% of those age 65 or over.

Workforce
In 2005, Knox County had 998 business units and 16,240 jobs. The largest employing industry in the county was education and health services (including both public and private employment) with almost 34 percent of total industry employment. Trade, transportation, and utilities came in second with over 22 percent of total industry employment. Manufacturing showed the most job growth and the largest percentage gain since 2001, increasing 316 jobs or almost 21 percent.

The 2005 all industry earnings average for Knox County was $26,875, up $2,824 or 11.7 percent over the county's 2001 average. The manufacturing industry had the highest average annual earnings at $33,238, increasing $1,695 since 2001. Annual earnings in the information sector increased the most between 2001 and 2005, up $6,518 or 29.7 percent.

The Vincennes area has a diversified economy. In 2005 retail trade was the largest of 20 major sectors. It had an average wage per job of $19,743. Per capita income grew by 17.9% between 1994 and 2004 (adjusted for inflation). While manufacturing accounts for 8.2% of the jobs, the services sector is rapidly growing. Knox County's ground breaking Pathways Program insures a well-trained, highly motivated labor force. Knox County encompasses an area that attracts approximately 300,000 potential employees within an easy commute. Because of the proximity of the surrounding counties, and ease of access to the Vincennes area, businesses routinely draw from a labor force that lies within a 50-mile radius of their work site.

See also
 National Register of Historic Places listings in Knox County, Indiana
 Frederick Hinde Zimmerman

References

 
1790 establishments in the Northwest Territory
Populated places established in 1790
Southwestern Indiana